The twenty-eighth season of Saturday Night Live, an American sketch comedy series, originally aired in the United States on NBC between October 5, 2002 and May 17, 2003.

Cast
Before the start of the season, longtime cast members Will Ferrell and Ana Gasteyer left the show. Ferrell, who had been a cast member for seven seasons since 1995, had left at the end of the previous season to pursue a career starring in films, while Gasteyer, who had been with the cast for six seasons since 1996, was on maternity leave during the break and decided not to return. Hired as new featured players were comedian and punk musician Fred Armisen and TV writer and comedian Will Forte (of The Groundlings). Armisen is the show's second Latino male cast member (Horatio Sanz being first), and also the second male cast member to have some Asian heritage (Rob Schneider being first).

This would be the final season for Chris Kattan and Tracy Morgan – cast members since 1996 – and Dean Edwards, who had been a feature player since 2001.

Cast roster

Repertory players
Rachel Dratch
Jimmy Fallon
Tina Fey
Darrell Hammond
Chris Kattan
Tracy Morgan
Chris Parnell
Amy Poehler
Maya Rudolph
Horatio Sanz

Featured players
Fred Armisen
Dean Edwards
Will Forte
Seth Meyers
Jeff Richards

bold denotes Weekend Update anchor

Writers

Episodes

Specials

References

28
Saturday Night Live in the 2000s
2002 American television seasons
2003 American television seasons
Television shows directed by Beth McCarthy-Miller